The Terek Oblast was a province (oblast) of the Caucasus Viceroyalty of the Russian Empire, roughly corresponding to the central part of Russia's North Caucasian Federal District. Тhe оblast was created out of the former territories of the North Caucasian Peoples, following their conquests by Russia throughout the 19th century. The Terek Oblast bordered the Astrakhan and Stavropol governorates to the north, the Kuban Oblast to the west, the Kutaisi and Tiflis governorates to the south, and the Dagestan Oblast to the east. The administrative center of the oblast was Vladikavkaz, the current capital of North Ossetia–Alania within Russia.

Administrative divisions 

Demographics

Russian Empire Census 
The plurality of the population indicated Russian to be their mother tongue, with significant Chechen, Ossetian, Kabardian, and Ingush speaking minorities.

Kavkazskiy kalendar 

Notes

References

Bibliography 

 
Caucasus Viceroyalty (1801–1917)
Oblasts of the Russian Empire
States and territories established in 1860
States and territories disestablished in 1920
1860 establishments in the Russian Empire